The eighth season of Dancing with the Stars was the first without original host Daryl Somers. Actor Daniel MacPherson was the new host. In a change to the judging panel, Paul Mercurio was replaced. In 2008, only one season was aired instead of two in previous years, the show was moved to Sunday night instead of Tuesday, and it was presented by new producers Freehand.

Season eight featured three finalists, however one couple was eliminated after a Cha-cha-cha showoff, which left two couples to compete for the season title. The season featured the following celebrities:

Couples

Scoring Chart
Red numbers indicate the couples with the lowest score for each week.
Green numbers indicate the couples with the highest score for each week.
 indicates the couple (or couples) eliminated that week.
 indicates the returning couple that finished in the bottom two.
 indicates the winning couple.
 indicates the runner-up couple.
 indicates the third-place couple.

In Weeks 1 and 2, special guest judge Bruno Tonioli was part of the judging panel, and scores were out of 40 instead of 30.

Dance Schedule
The celebrities and professional partners danced one of these routines for each corresponding week.

Week 1 : Cha-cha-cha or Foxtrot
Week 2 : Jive or Tango
Week 3 : Samba or Waltz
Week 4 : Quickstep or Paso Doble
Week 5 : Salsa or Argentine Tango
Week 6 : West Coast Swing or Rumba
Week 7 : Two unlearned dances (Week 1 to Week 6) to the theme of songs from the movies.
Week 8 : Two unlearned dances (Week 1 to Week 6)
Week 9 : Judges Choice and a Segue Of Three Dances
Week 10 : Favourite dance of the season, Cha-cha-cha showdown, & Freestyle

Highest And Lowest Scoring Performances 
The best and worst performances in each dance according to the judges' marks are as follows:

Couples' highest and lowest scoring dances
The best and worst performances in each dance according to the judges' 30-point scale are as follows (guest judges scores are excluded):

Dance Chart

 Highest Scoring Dance
 Lowest Scoring Dance

This dance was repeated by the couple at the finale.

Average Chart

The average chart is based on the dances performed by celebrities and not their place in the competition.

Running Order
Unless indicated otherwise, individual judges scores in the chart below (given in parentheses) are listed in this order from left to right: Todd McKenney, Helen Richey,  Mark Wilson.

Week 1 
Individual judges scores in the chart below (given in parentheses) are listed in this order from left to right: Todd McKenney, Helen Richey,  Mark Wilson, Bruno Tonioli.
Running order

Week 2 
Individual judges scores in the chart below (given in parentheses) are listed in this order from left to right: Todd McKenney, Helen Richey,  Mark Wilson, Bruno Tonioli.
Musical guests: 
Running order

Week 3 

Musical guests: 
Running order

Week 4 

Musical guests: 
Running order

Week 5 

Musical guests: 
Running order

Week 6 

Musical guests: 
Running order

Week 7 

Musical guests: 
Running order

Week 8 

Musical guests: 
Running order

Week 9 

Musical guests: 
Running order

Week 10 

Musical guests: 
Running order

Recap from the series
Week 1:
All 10 couples performed their first dance of the competition. Guest Judge Bruno Tonioli was judging as was Todd McKenney, Helen Richey and Mark Wilson. Toni and Henry finished a clear 1st place with a Cha-Cha-Cha scoring 35 with 9s from all the judges except Bruno. Paul and Eliza finished 2nd with 29 points for their Foxtrot. James and Jade finished last and scored just 18 points.

Week 2:
The second show features guest judge Bruno Tonioli and the other three main judges. Cal and Craig may not have been the best in Week 1 but they turned it round and finished 1st with 34 points for their Tango. Red and Ana finished bottom of the leaderboard with just 17 points for their Jive. Brooke and John-Paul were the first couple to be eliminated.

Week 3:
In the third show and since there were only the main judges (Todd McKenney, Helen Richey and Mark Wilson. Danny and Natalie were 1st on the leaderboard for their Waltz and received the only 9 of the evening (this was given by Mark). Red and Ana finished bottom of the leaderboard for the second week in a row with 19 points for their Waltz. There was a highlight from Luke and Luda's Samba which scored 20 points but his tongue accidentally stuck out which was severely criticised by Todd who gave him a 6. James and Jade were the second couple to leave.

Week 4:
Toni and Henry were 1st on the leaderboard for their Quickstep and received the first 10 of the series (this was given by Mark). Luke and Luda were welcomed to the competition and mentioned as the dark horse by the judges and earned him 25 points. Red and Ana for the third time in a row finished last with 19 points, which however was a better score for Red's performance. Cal and Craig were the next to leave.

Week 5
Paul & Eliza were 1st on the leaderboard for their Argentine Tango but Luke and Luda and Charli and Csaba really got the competition going as Luke kept up the good performance from the previous week and Charli and Csaba mentioned it was their coming out week and did just that and came equal second. Red and Ana, yet another time finished bottom with 21 points, again a better performance but it wasn't enough to remove him from last and him and Ana were eliminated from the competition.

Reception

Viewership

References

Season 08
2008 Australian television seasons